Hollywood Zombies was a trading card series manufactured by Topps, which portrayed American celebrities at the time as flesh-eating zombies. Released in 2007, the series was available only in select comic book specialty stores and video stores. 

Among the many commercial artists and illustrators contributing to this series were Layron DeJarnette, Drew Friedman, Jay Lynch, Hermann Mejia and John Zeleznik. A number of the artists and writers had previously worked on either the Garbage Pail Kids and Wacky Packages trading card series or Mad magazine.

A comic book series based on the cards was planned by IDW Publishing, but it was never published.

References

External links
  (archived 18 May 2007)

Trading cards
Parodies of advertising
Card games introduced in 2007
Topps